Arcadia or Arcadia Aegypti was a Late Roman province in northern Egypt. It was named for one of the reigning Augusti of the Roman Empire, Arcadius of the Theodosian dynasty when it was created in the late 4th century. Its capital was Oxyrhynchus and its territory encompassed the Arsinoite nome and the  "Heptanomia" ("seven nomes") region.

History 
It was created between 386 and ca. 395 out of the province of Augustamnica and most of the historical region known as "Heptanomis" ("seven nomes"), except for Hermopolis, which belonged to the Thebaid.
 
In the Notitia Dignitatum, Arcadia forms one of six provinces of the Diocese of Egypt, under a governor with the low rank of praeses.

By 636, the praeses governor had been replaced by a governor with the rank of dux.

Episcopal sees 
Ancient episcopal sees in the Roman province of Arcadia Aegypti, listed in the Annuario Pontificio as titular sees:

References

Sources 
 

Byzantine Egypt
Roman provinces in Africa
Late Roman provinces
Roman Egypt
States and territories established in the 4th century
4th-century establishments in Egypt
States and territories disestablished in the 7th century
640s disestablishments in the Byzantine Empire
380s establishments